, also known as , is a Japanese animator best known for illustrating the light novel Love, Chunibyo & Other Delusions, which has been adapted into two anime television series and a film by Kyoto Animation.

Works
 (as Nozomi Ōsaka) Love, Chunibyo & Other Delusions
 (as Non) Adachi to Shimamura
 (as Non) Nanana's Buried Treasure

References

External links
  

Year of birth missing (living people)
Living people
Manga artists